Cauchy's test may refer to:

 Cauchy's root test
 Cauchy's condensation test
 the integral test for convergence, sometimes known as the Maclaurin–Cauchy test

These topics are named after Augustin-Louis Cauchy, a French mathematician.

 Mathematics disambiguation pages